The Tribal Assembly was an assembly consisting of all Roman citizens convened by tribes (tribus).

In the Roman Republic, citizens did not elect legislative representatives. Instead, they voted themselves on legislative matters in the popular assemblies (the comitia centuriata, the tribal assembly and the plebeian council). Bills were proposed by magistrates and the citizens only exercised their right to vote.

In the Tribal Assembly, citizens were organized on the basis of 35 tribes: four urban tribes of the citizens in the city of Rome, and 31 rural tribes of citizens outside the city. Each tribe voted separately and one after the other. In each tribe, decisions were made by majority vote and its decision counted as one vote regardless of how many electors each tribe held. Once a majority of tribes voted in the same way on a given measure, the voting ended and the matter was decided.

The Tribal Assembly was chaired by a magistrate, usually a consul or a praetor. The presiding magistrate made all decisions on matters of procedure and legality. His power over the assembly could be nearly absolute. One check on his power came in the form of vetoes by other magistrates. Also, any decision made by a presiding magistrate could be vetoed by the plebeian tribunes.

The Tribal Assembly elected the quaestors, and the curule aediles. It conducted trials for non-capital punishment cases. However, the Roman Dictator Lucius Cornelius Sulla reassigned this to special jury courts (quaestiones perpetuae) in 82 BC. There are disagreements among modern historians regarding the number and nature of the tribal assembly (see below).

Definitions of types of assemblies
The Romans distinguished between two types of assemblies, the comitia (or comitatus) and the contio (contracted from conventio). The word comitia (going together), which was the plural of comitium (a purpose-built meeting place), referred to assemblies convened to make decisions on legislative or judicial matters or to hold elections. The word contio (coming together) referred to  meetings where 'nothing was legally enacted'. They were convened to hear public announcements and pronouncements, speeches and debates, witness the interrogation of someone accused of in a trial and to watch executions. Opinions expressed in a contio did not have any legal validity. The tribal assembly was a comitia. Private citizens who did not hold political office could make speeches in a contio, but not before a comitia or a concilium. Voters always assembled first in a contio to hear debates or to enable canvassing by electoral candidates before voting. The actual voting took place in a comitia or concilium (for this term, see below).

Gellius wrote about a further distinction between comita and concilium, which he based on a quote from  a passage written by Laelius Felix, an early second century AD jurist:

This has been taken as referring to the assembly which was reserved for the plebeians (or plebs, the commoners), thus excluding the patricians (the aristocracy), and which was convened by the tribunes of the plebs (also called by modern historians plebeian tribunes) – see plebeian council. Since the meetings of the plebs excluded the patricians, they were not considered as representing the whole of the Roman people and because of this, according to Laelius Felix, the term concilium applied to them. By contrast, the term comitia applied to assemblies which represented the whole of the Roman people.  Measures passed by assemblies of the whole citizen body were called leges (laws), whereas those passed only by the plebeians were called plebiscites (resolutions of the plebs). Until the lex Hortensia passed by Quintus Hortensius in 287 BC, the patricians refused to accept the plebiscites as being binding on them on the ground that, because of their exclusion, did not apply to the whole of the people.

Disagreements on the number and nature of tribal assemblies

Andrew Lintott notes that many modern historians follow Theodor Mommsen's view that during the Roman Republic there were two assemblies of the tribes and that the ancient sources used the term comitia tributa with reference both of them. One was the assembly by the tribes which was used for plebeian meetings to which the patricians were excluded and which was convened by the plebeian tribunes. The other assembly based on the tribes was convened by the Roman consuls or the praetors and was an assembly of the whole of the Roman people (both patricians and plebeians). However, the ancient sources did not have a differentiation in terminology for the two of them and used the term comitia tributa for both.

Many modern historians use the term comitia tributa or comitia populi tributa (comitia tributa of the people) to indicate meetings by the tribes which involved the whole of the Roman people (populus) and the term concilium plebis or concilium plebis tributum (plebeian council by the tribes) for assemblies based on the tribes which were exclusively for the plebeians. However, they are not found in the ancient Roman literature related to the Roman Republic. Therefore, they denote a distinction which can be disputed. It is based on the text by Gellius quoted above.

Lintott notes that some modern historians reject the comitia tributa/concilium plebis distinction and the use of the quote by Gellius as its basis. They argue that this terminology is a convention established by modern historians which ancient writers did not make and that there was no assembly based on tribes other than the one where the plebeians met to vote and which was presided over by the plebeian tribunes, who submitted bills to its vote. References to laws which were submitted to the comitia tributa by the consuls in the ancient literature must have pertained to bills they presented to the comitia centuriata (the assembly of the soldiers, another voting assembly), a deviation from correct procedure found in the late Republic or instances in which these officials got the plebeian tribunes to propose bills for them. Lintott disagrees with the notion that there was only one assembly based on the tribes, which was the one of the plebeians. He notes that there are examples in which laws were proposed to the comitia tributa by the consuls, who did not preside over the assembly of the plebeians. Examples of such laws are the law which increased the number of quaestors to twenty, which was attributed to Lucius Cornelius Sulla, the lex Gabinia Calpurnia de insula Delo of 58 BC and the lex Quinctia of 9 BC. Moreover, the consuls conducted the elections of the curule aediles, who were not plebeian officials, before the tribes. Therefore, it is likely that the term comitia tributa was used both for the assemblies presided over by the consuls and the praetors and the assemblies presided over by the plebeian tribunes. One could add to this that Livy mentioned a comitia tributa which was convened by the consuls in 446 BC; that is, during the early Republic.

Forsythe presents a more recent account of the argument that the comitia tributa/concilium plebis distinction is a misplaced convention established by modern historians. He argues that it is found only in the quote by Gellius which comes from a text which was written in the imperial period; that is, after the fall of the Roman Republic and long after the assemblies of the Republic had ceased to function. This implies that Laelius Felix was not sufficiently familiar with these republican institutions. Forsythe argues that the distinctions between two assemblies based on the tribes "has no support in the extensive writings of Cicero and Livy, who must have been far more knowledgeable in these matters than Laelius Felix." Cicero lived during the late Republic. Livy was born during the late Republic and wrote a detailed history of the republican period. Forsythe also argues that the word comitia was used for formal assemblies convened 'to vote on legislative, electoral and judicial matters', and that concilium was a generic term 'for any kind of public meetings of citizens, including both comitia and contio.' His conclusion is that the mentioned distinction is an artificial modern construction with no authority in ancient texts, that 'the ancients speak only of a comitia tributa''' and that it is likely that in Republican times there was a single tribal assembly known as comitia tributa.

According to the Roman tradition, in 494 BC, fifteen years after the overthrow of the monarchy and the establishment of the Roman Republic, the Plebeiany temporarily seceded from the city of Rome, which started the two hundred-year Conflict of the Orders between the Patricians (the aristocracy) and the Plebeians (the commoners). During this first secession, the plebeians created their own institutions which were separate from those of the Roman state, which at that time  was controlled by the patricians, and were intended to protect the interests of the plebeians. These included the plebeian tribunes, the plebeian aediles and the plebeian assembly.

Forsythe takes the revisionist view further. He rejects the idea there was a plebeian assembly and maintains that the comitia tributa was an assembly of the whole of the Roman people and opines that the plebeian secession was a myth created in later times. Roman historians emerged in the late third and early second century BC, some three hundred year after the date attributed to this secession and the events of Rome's early history were poorly documented. Based on T. P. Wiseman's view that many of Rome's early historical traditions 'were created, propagated, accepted and reshaped' from the middle of the fourth century BC onward through dramas played on the stage at religious festivals Forsythe argues that the story of the plebeian secession was invented in one such performances to explain the origin of the temple of Ceres and its plebeian associations. It was inspired by Herodotus' account of how Telines, a ruler of Gela, a Greek town in Sicily, used the rites of Demeter and Persephone to bring back to Gela a group of political exiles. This story of civil discord, reconciliation and integration and the cult of Demeter was used to fabricate the tale of the first plebeian secession where the plebeians seceded from Rome but were then reconciled and returned to the city. The Ludi Ceriales (the games of Ceres) were held annually to celebrate the anniversary of the dedication of the temple of Ceres, which was dated by the tradition two years before the first secession.

 Assembly procedures 
The convening of the assembly was announced three market-days (nundinae) in advance. The viatores (messengers) were sent "to inform those in country districts" about the convening of the assembly. Later, for elections it was established that there should be a trinundinum, an interval of at least three market-days between the announcement of the election and the vote of the assembly, during which no legislation was permitted. The lex Caecilia Didia of 98 BC required a trinundinum interval between the announcement of a law and the vote. In the case of prosecutions before an assembly, the magistrate who presided over it was required to give "notice (diem dicere) to the accused of the first day of the investigation (inquisitio), then at the end of each hearing he announced the adjournment to the next (diem prodicere). After this there was a trinundinum interval before the assembly voted the verdict. There are disagreements among scholars about how many days this interval lasted. Mommsen proposes 24 days, Michels 25 days. Lintott gives a flexible suggestion, 17 days or more.Michels, A. K., The Calendar of the Roman Republic (1967), pp. 88, 191ff.

There could be only one assembly operating at a time. The augur Marcus Valerius Messalla Rufus (who was consul in 53 BC) wrote a rule book (On Auspices). Among other things, it established that lesser magistrates could not call off (avocare, call away) an assembly which had already been convened. Thus, "whoever of them first summons the people to an election has the law on his side, because it is unlawful to take the same action twice with the people  nor can one minor magistrate call away an assembly from another."  However, a consul could call off a comitia or contio convened by another magistrate and a praetor could call off one summoned by other magistrates except a consul. If an assembly was called "to address a contio without laying any measure before them, it is lawful for any number of magistrates to hold a contio at the same time." Lintott suggests that this rule was intended to prevent rivalry among magistrates.

In addition to the presiding magistrate of an assembly there were several other magistrates to act as assistants. They were available to help resolve procedural disputes and to provide a mechanism for electors to appeal the decisions of the presiding magistrate. Since the Romans believed that the gods communicated their approval or disapproval with proposed actions, the presiding magistrate performed augury (the divination of the omens of the gods) the night before a meeting. There were also augurs (priests who performed augury), either in attendance or on-call, who would be available to help interpret the omens of the gods. The meeting could only proceed if the omens were favourable. On several known occasions, presiding magistrates used the claim of unfavourable omens as an excuse to suspend a session that was not going the way they wanted. If after the assembly the augurs decided that some formality had been neglected, its vote became void. In the case of elections, those persons who had been elected to an office had to resign.

There were several cases in which an assembly could be adjourned. On religious grounds, this could happen, besides when the auspices were found to be unfavourable, when the gods manifested their displeasure by rain, thunder, or lightning or if the sun set before the proceedings were completed – this was because the auspices were considered to be valid only for one day from dawn to sunset. Other reasons were the veto of a plebeian tribune and one of the assembled citizens suffering an epileptic fit (morbus comitialis). In the politically volatile years of the late Republic, at times assemblies were broken up by riots. If an assembly convened as a court, its being broken up was equivalent to an acquittal of the accused.

On the day of the vote the tribes convened at dawn. The meeting started with a prayer, unaccompanied by sacrifice. For legislative meetings the presiding magistrate was the one who proposed the bill (rogatio legis) to be voted on and after the prayer he laid his bill before the people. For electoral meetings, he announced the names of the candidates. If the meeting was for a trial, he made the people acquainted with the nature of the offence on which the people had to pass a verdict. He concluded the announcement with the words velitis, jubeatis Quirites (command your wish, citizens). A rogatio was read out by the praeco (the crier or herald). Then the contio begun. The voters were not sorted into their tribes. For legislative matters there was a debate on the rogatio in which private citizens had to ask the presiding magistrate for permission to speak. This debate took place before the bill was either vetoed or put to the vote.Lintott, A., The Constitution of the Roman Republic, p. 45 If the vote was for an election, the candidates used the contio for canvassing and there were no speeches by private citizens. 
 
After the above, the voters were told to break up the contio and to arrange themselves by the tribes with the formula discedite, quirites (depart to your separate groups, citizens). The tribes voted one by one. The voters assembled in enclosures called saepta and voted by placing a pebble or written ballot into an appropriate jar. The baskets (cistae) that held the votes were watched by officers (the custodes) who then counted the ballots and reported the results to the presiding magistrate. The majority of votes in each tribe decided how that tribe voted. The presiding magistrate (either a consul or a praetor), always ensured that all tribes had at least five members voting, and if a tribe did not, individuals from other tribes were reassigned to the vacant places in that tribe. The order in which the tribes voted was determined by lot. An urn into which lots were cast was brought in. From then on, the plebeian tribunes were not allowed to exercise their right to veto. The first tribe to vote was called praerogativa or principium and the result of its vote was announced immediately. The tribes which voted next were called jure vocatae. When a majority of tribes had voted the same way, voting ended. The results of votes of each tribe was announced in an order also determined by lot before the announcement of the final result. This announcement was called renuntiatio. The praerogativa or principium was usually the most important tribe, because it often decided the matter through a bandwagon effect. It was believed that the order of the lot was chosen by the gods, and thus, that the position held by the tribes which voted earlier was the position of the gods. If the voting process was not complete by nightfall, the electors were dismissed and the voting had to begin again the next day. Laws passed by the comitia took effect as soon as the results were announced.

It has been speculated that the word suffragium (vote) indicates that in the early days the men in the assembly made a crash with their arms to signal approval, rather than vote. Another speculation is that  the term rogatores (sing. rogator,  a teller, an official who asked the people for their votes or collected votes) indicates that in later times, but before the introduction of the written ballot, the assembled men were asked to express their votes verbally and that this was recorded with marks inscribed in tablets. However, there is no evidence for either of these. The written ballot was introduced by a series of laws, the  lex Gabinia tabellaria (139 BC) for elections, the lex Cassia tebellaria (137 BC) for non-capital punishment trials, the lex Papiria (131 BC) for legislation, and the lex Coelia (106 BC)  for capital punishment trials (which were conducted before the comitia centuriata). This was an introduction of secret ballots which reduced undue influence or intimidation by the powerful elites, which was at times a problem during votes.
 
Although the order of voting was determined by lot, there was also an official order of the tribes, known as the ordo tribuum.  The first four tribes were the urban tribes, in the order: Suburana, Palatina, Esquilina, Collina. The rural tribes followed, concluding with Aniensis. Crawford postulates that the rustic tribes were enumerated along the major roads leading from Rome (the Viae Ostiensis, Appia, Latina, Praenestina, Valeria, Salaria, Flaminia and Clodia), in a counter-clockwise order: Romilia, Voltinia, Voturia, Aemilia, Horatia, Maecia, Scaptia, Pomptina, Falerina, Lemonia, Papiria, Ufentina, Terentina, Pupinia, Menenia, Publilia, Cornelia, Claudia, Camilia, Aniensis, Fabia, Pollia, Sergia, Clustumina, Quirina, Velina, Stellatina, Tromentina, Galeria, Sabatina, Arniensis.  This list omits the tribus Popillia, one of the earlier tribes.

The location of the meetings of the Tribal Assembly varied. Up to 145 BC  were centred on the comitium, a templum (open-air space) built for public meetings at the north end of the Roman Forum. The rostra, a speaking platform on the southern side of the comitium, was used for speeches. It was also used as a tribunal; that is, as a platform to deliver the votes. Then this place became too cramped and the steps of the Temple of Castor and Pollux at the forum's south-east end were used as the tribunal. Elevated gangways (pontes) which provided access to it were built by the second century BC. Meetings were also sometimes held in the area Capitolina, an open space in front and around the temple of Jupiter Optimus Maximus, on the southern summit of the Capitoline Hill. In the late Republic the meetings were held outside the city walls, at the Campus Martius (the Field of Mars) a large flat area which could accommodate the simultaneous voting of the tribes and thus speed up the process.

Decline
In the politically volatile and highly corrupt final years of the Roman Republic, the popular assemblies were susceptible to corruption and vulnerable to politically motivated violence by contenting political factions. The establishment of the Second Triumvirate in 43 BC effectively abolished the functions of the comitia, as the triumvirs were granted authority by the lex Titia to appoint practically all offices without consulting the senate or the people. Some actions were still passed using the assemblies, with certain laws providing for the erection of temples, the remission of rents in 41 BC, and the lex Falcidia governing inheritance in 40 BC; similarly, various laws granting the triumvirs the right to wear the civic crown were passed by plebiscite, as it would have been unseemly for them to simply have granted themselves those honours.

With the establishment of absolute rule by emperors after the fall of the Republic, the Republican assemblies were emasculated. Augustus, the first Roman emperor, became the real legislator and the comitia's role in passing laws became only a ceremonial one. He also removed the comitia's judicial functions, though these functions had fallen into disuse long before. This assembly's electoral functions also become only nominal, with the assemblies effectively being dominated by the emperor. Augustus filled half of the magistracies with his own candidates, though the magistracies as a whole had, by this point, so little political importance that imperial control over elections was minimal. His successor, Tiberius transferred the comitia's remaining electoral authority to the senate. Although the emperors received many of their powers from the comitia tributa, this was only a formality. The comitia tributa continued to exist until the third century AD, but its remaining functions were only symbolic. It took auspices and gave prayer. It conferred the emperor's legislative powers and other authority only in a ceremonial manner. It proclaimed the laws presented to it for approval by acclamatio, rather than a real vote.

Tribes

The 35 tribes were not ethnic or kinship groups, but geographic divisions into which Roman citizens were distributed. They were administrative districts which served for the purposes of taxation, the military levy and for the registration of Roman citizens. This registration occurred regularly during the census and the names of citizens and their families were entered in the registers of the tribes. Lintott notes that 'the tribe was the critical indicator of Roman citizenship' for the adult sons of Roman fathers and also for 'those incorporated into the citizen body from the outside'. A man who came of age was enrolled as a new adult in the tribe of his father and could change it only through adoption into another family. Inhabitants of Italic towns who were incorporated into the Roman state by being given Roman citizenship were also registered in tribes. Consequently, "the tribe might therefore, came to bear little relationship to the whereabouts of the citizen's domicile or property." With regard to the tribal assembly, the tribes were its voting districts. Each tribe had further subdivisions, which in the urban tribes were called vici (sing. vicus,  in an urban context it meant neighbourhood) and in the rural tribes were called pagi (sing. pagus – which were rural sub-districts with a number of vici (which in a rural context meant villages and hamlets) and had a fortress. Professional guilds (collegia), were  organised along tribal lines.

The tribes were originally presided over by tribuni aerarii (tribunes of the public treasury) who  had the tribal register and collected the property tax and paid the soldiers registered in the tribe.<ref>Oxford Classical Dictionary, 2nd Ed. (1970): "Tribuni Aerarii."</ref> Later this title became obsolete and the heads of the tribes were called curatores tribuum. Besides these curatores there were also the divisores tribuum who were treasurers. These two types of officials probably had their own registers; the curatores were involved in the census. By the late republic, their main task was to distribute bribes. Because tribal membership was re-registered once every five years in each census, it became possible to crudely gerrymander the tribes. While land could never be taken away from a tribe, the "censors" had the power to allocate new lands to existing tribes as a part of the Census. Thus, the censors had the power to apportion tribes in a manner that might be advantageous to them or to their partisans.

See also 
 Roman tribe
 Pagus
 Vicus
 Collegia
 Roman censor
 Centuriate Assembly
 Plebeian Council
 Curiate Assembly

Notes

References 
 Abbott, Frank Frost (1901). A History and Description of Roman Political Institutions. Elibron Classics.
 Byrd, Robert (1995). The Senate of the Roman Republic. U.S. Government Printing Office, Senate Document 103-23.
 Cicero, Marcus Tullius (1841). The Political Works of Marcus Tullius Cicero: Comprising his Treatise on the Commonwealth; and his Treatise on the Laws. Translated from the original, with Dissertations and Notes in Two Volumes. By Francis Barham, Esq. London: Edmund Spettigue. Vol. 1.
 Harper's Dictionary of Classical Antiquities, Second Edition, Harry Thurston Peck, Editor (1897): Comitia 
 Lintott, Andrew, "The Constitution of the Roman Republic" Oxford University Press, USA; new edition 2003; 
 Taylor, Lily Ross (1966). Roman Voting Assemblies: From the Hannibalic War to the Dictatorship of Caesar (Thomas Spencer Jerome Lectures), William Morrow, 1965; new edition by University of Michigan Press, 1991;   
 Taylor, L. R., Voting Districts of the Roman Republic: The Thirty-Five, Urban and Rural Tribes (Papers and Monographs of the American Academy in Rome), University of Michigan Press, Revised edition, 2013; 
 Smith, W., Wayte, W., Marindin, G. E., (Eds), A Dictionary of Greek and Roman Antiquities (1890): Tribus

Further reading
 Cameron, Avril,  The Later Roman Empire, (Fontana Press, 1993). 
 Crawford, Michael The Roman Republic (Fontana History of the Ancient World), Fontana Press; New edition, 2011; 
 Crawford, Michael, "Tribus, Tesserae, et Regions," in Comptes rendus de l'Academie des Inscriptions et Belles-Lettres (2002) vol. 146, pp. 1125–1135
 Gruen, Erich,  "The Last Generation of the Roman Republic", University of California Press, new edition, 1995; 
 Ihne, Wilhelm. Researches Into the History of the Roman Constitution: With an Appendix upon the Roman Knights (1853), reproduction by Leopold Classic Library, 2016; ASIN: B01AUO6MHU  
 Millar, Fergus, The Emperor in the Roman World, Bristol Classical Press; new edition, 1992; 
 Mommsen, Theodor. Roman Constitutional Law. 1871–1888
 The Roman Constitution to the Time of Cicero
 Tighe, Ambrose. The Development of the Roman Constitution (1859), reproduction by Wentworth Press, 2016; 
 Whetstone Johnston, Harold Orations and Letters of Cicero: With Historical Introduction, An Outline of the Roman Constitution, Notes, Vocabulary and Index (1891), reproduction by Ulan Press, 2012; ASIN: B009FU4FVQ

External links

Government of the Roman Republic
Popular assemblies

es:Comicios romanos#Comicios Tribunados
ka:კომიცია#ტრიბუნული კომიციები
sh:Rimske skupštine#Comitia tributa
fi:Comitia#Comitia tributa